Khedebneithirbinet I (“Neith Kills the Evil Eye”) was an ancient Egyptian queen from the 26th Dynasty, probably the wife of pharaoh Necho II and the mother of his successor, Psamtik II.

Biography
The identification as Necho's wife is solely based on the fact that her sarcophagus dates to the 26th Dynasty, that her titles as King's wife and King's mother  fit, and that no other wife is attested for the king. Her stone sarcophagus lid (ÄS3), now located in the Kunsthistorisches Museum in Vienna, was discovered in 1807 and indicates that she was probably buried at Sebennytos in Lower Egypt if the provenance given for this object is correct.

References

7th-century BC Egyptian women
6th-century BC Egyptian women
Queens consort of the Twenty-sixth Dynasty of Egypt
7th-century BC Egyptian people
6th-century BC Egyptian people
Necho II